Berkus is a surname. Notable people with the surname include:

Barry Berkus (1935–2012), American architect
Dave Berkus (born 1941), American angel investor and venture capitalist
Günther Berkus (1951–2020), German-Irish artist, musician, and director
Nate Berkus (born 1971), American interior designer, author, and television personality